Shayuan Station is an interchange station of Guangzhou Metro Line 8 and Guangfo Line. It is located at the underground of the junction of Rongjing Road and Gongye Avenue North in Haizhu District. It was put into service on November 3, 2010. The Guangfo Line service has entered operations on December 28, 2015.

Station layout

Exits

References

Railway stations in China opened in 2010
Guangzhou Metro stations in Haizhu District
Foshan Metro stations